is a Japanese television personality and former member of the Japanese idol girl group AKB48. Nagao is represented by Irving.

Career 

Mariya Nagao joined AKB48 as a 9th generation trainee in late 2009. On December 8, 2010, together with Mina Oba, Haruka Shimazaki, Haruka Shimada, Miyu Takeuchi, Mariko Nakamura, Anna Mori, and Suzuran Yamauchi, she was promoted to a full member, but stayed unassigned to any of the three teams until 2011 when Team 4 was formed. In the 2012 AKB48 elections (AKB48 27th Single Senbatsu Sōsenkyo) Mariya Nagao placed 39th.

On November 1, 2012, she was transferred to Team K. In 2013 she was assigned to be one of the members to sing the title track on the AKB48's 31st single "Sayonara Crawl". In the 2013 AKB48 elections (AKB48 32nd Single Senbatsu Sōsenkyo) Mariya Nagao placed 35th. In the 2014 AKB48 elections (AKB48 37th Single Senbatsu Sōsenkyo) she placed 65th. In the 2015 AKB48 elections (AKB48 41st Single Senbatsu Sōsenkyo) she placed 69th. On December 7, 2015 Mariya Nagao announced her graduation from AKB48. On March 10, 2016, shortly before officially leaving the group (the graduation ceremony was due March 19), Mariya Nagao released her first photobook, titled Utsukushii Saibō. With approximately 7,000 copies sold in the first week (according to Oricon), it debuted in the first place of the Oricon Photobook Chart. Her 3rd photobook titled "JOSHUA" release in August 2019.

Appearances

TV dramas 
 Majisuka Gakuen 2 (TV Tokyo, 2011) as Mariyagi
 Hanazakari no Kimitachi e (Fuji TV, 2011)
 Shiritsu Bakaleya Koukou (NTV, 2012) as Mana Honsō
 Majisuka Gakuen 3 (TV Tokyo, 2012) as Yagi
 Majisuka Gakuen 4 (NTV, 2015) as Gekkou
 JK wa Yukionna (MBS, 2015) as Kaori Yamashita
 Majisuka Gakuen 5 (NTV, 2015) as Gekkou
 Kazoku no Katachi (TBS, 2016) as Mariya Koyama
 Saki (MBS and TBS, 2016) as Touka Ryūmonbuchi
 Koe Girl! (TV Asahi, 2018) as Ineba Ren
 Investor Z (TV Tokyo, 2018) as Hiroko Machida
 Perfect Crime (TV Asahi, 2019)

Film
 Ghost Master (2019)

Events 
 Girls Award (2014 A/W, 2015 S/S)

Bibliography

Photobooks 
  (10 March 2016, Tokuma Shoten) 
  (2017, Wani Books)

References

External links 
 Official profile at Irving

1994 births
Living people
AKB48 members
Japanese idols
Japanese female models
Japanese gravure models
Japanese women pop singers
Musicians from Kanagawa Prefecture
King Records (Japan) artists
21st-century Japanese women singers
21st-century Japanese singers
21st-century Japanese actresses